The 2008 Lux Style Awards, officially known as the 7th Lux Style Awards ceremony, presented by the Lux Style Awards honours the best films of 2008 and took place at the DHA Golf Club, Karachi on 29 October 2008. This year, the city of lights played host to the Pakistani Film Industry.

The official ceremony took place on 29 Oct, 08, at the Expo Centre, in Karachi. During the ceremony, Lux Style Awards were awarded in 29 competitive categories. The ceremony was televised in Pakistan and internationally on Geo TV. Actor Shaan Shahid, Fawad Khan and rockstar Ali Azmat hosted the ceremony.
 Previous Ceremony: 6th Lux Style Awards
 Next Ceremony: 8th Lux Style Awards

Background 
The Lux Style Awards is an award ceremony held annually in Pakistan since 2002. The awards celebrate "style" in the Pakistani entertainment industry, and honour the country's best talents in film, television, music, and fashion. Around 30 awards are given annually.

Winners and nominees 

Winners are listed first and highlighted in boldface.

Special awards

Chairperson's Lifetime Achievement Award 
 Reshma

Lifetime Achievement Award in Fashion 
 Sughra Kazmi

Best Dressed Celebrity (female) 
 Tooba Siddiqui

Best Dressed Celebrity (male) 
 Atif Aslam

References

External links 

Lux Style Awards ceremonies
2008 film awards
2008 television awards
2008 music awards
Lux
Lux